Tetraleucus is a genus of ground beetles in the family Carabidae. This genus has a single species, Tetraleucus picticornis. It is found in North America.

References

Platyninae